Munfordville is a home rule-class city in, and the county seat of, Hart County, Kentucky, United States. The population was 1,615 at the 2010 U.S. census.

History
The settlement was once known as "Big Buffalo Crossing". The current name came from Richard Jones Munford, who donated the land to establish the new county seat in 1816. Munfordville was incorporated in 1858.

In 1862, the Civil War Battle of Munfordville took place in the town.

Geography
Munfordville is located in central Hart County at  (37.276608, -85.897822), on the north side of the Green River. U.S. Route 31W is Munfordville's Main Street, while Interstate 65 passes just northwest of town, with access from Exit 65. I-65 leads north  to Elizabethtown and southwest  to Bowling Green.

Demographics

As of the census of 2000, there were 1,563 people, 698 households, and 418 families residing in the city. The racial makeup of the city was 87.33% White, 11.45% Black or African American, 0.13% Asian, 0.13% from other races, and 0.96% from two or more races. Hispanic or Latino of any race were 1.09% of the population.

There were 698 households, out of which 23.4% had children under the age of 18 living with them, 41.4% were married couples living together, 14.9% had a female householder with no husband present, and 40.0% were non-families. 36.5% of all households were made up of individuals, and 19.3% had someone living alone who was 65 years of age or older. The average household size was 2.18 and the average family size was 2.82.

The age distribution was 20.7% under the age of 18, 8.8% from 18 to 24, 23.7% from 25 to 44, 24.3% from 45 to 64, and 22.6% who were 65 years of age or older. The median age was 42 years. For every 100 females, there were 82.8 males. For every 100 females age 18 and over, there were 77.1 males.

The median income for a household in the city was $18,015, and the median income for a family was $26,333. Males had a median income of $25,417 versus $20,417 for females. The per capita income for the city was $11,447. About 23.7% of families and 26.2% of the population were below the poverty line, including 33.9% of those under age 18 and 25.8% of those age 65 or over.

In 2010, Munfordville had the 20th-lowest median household income of all places in the United States with a population over 1,000.

Amish settlement 
The Amish settlement near Munfordville was founded in 1989. It has ties to the Geauga Amish settlement in Ohio, from where many of the Munfordville Amish came. It is the fastest-growing Amish settlement in America and had 14 church districts and a total population of about 1,800 as of 2013.

Education
Munfordville has a lending library, the Hart County Public Library.

Notable people
Several government officials were born in Munfordville. Thomas John Wood, a US Army major general, and Simon B. Buckner Sr, a Confederate lieutenant general, knew each other as boys but then fought on opposing sides during the American Civil War. Buckner became governor of Kentucky (1887–1891) and ran unsuccessfully for vice president of the United States (1896). His son, Simon Bolivar Buckner, Jr., was also born in Munfordville and served as a lieutenant general during World War II. Thelma Loyace Hawkins Stovall was a pioneering female Southern politician who won several statewide elective offices in Kentucky.

Poet, Davis McCombs, grew up in Munfordville.

See also
Johnson Springs

References

External links
 City of Munfordville official website
 Hart County News-Herald, local newspaper

Cities in Hart County, Kentucky
Cities in Kentucky
County seats in Kentucky
Populated places established in 1816
1816 establishments in Kentucky